The premier of Newfoundland and Labrador is current title of the first minister for the Canadian province of Newfoundland and Labrador, which was at certain points in its history a colony, dominion, and province. The province had a system of responsible government from 1855 to 1934, and again since 1949. Newfoundland became a British crown colony in 1855, in 1907 it became a dominion, and in 1949, it became a province and joined Canadian Confederation. Since then, the province has been a part of the Canadian federation and has kept its own legislature to deal with provincial matters. The province was named Newfoundland and Labrador on April 1, 1949 .

The province has a unicameral Westminster-style parliamentary government, in which the premier is the leader of the party that controls the most seats in the House of Assembly. The premier is Newfoundland and Labrador's head of government, and the king of Canada is its head of state and is represented by the lieutenant governor of Newfoundland and Labrador. The premier picks a cabinet from the elected members to form the Executive Council of Newfoundland and Labrador, and presides over that body. Members are first elected to the House during general elections. General elections must be conducted every four years from the date of the last election. An election may also take place if the governing party loses the confidence of the legislature by the defeat of a supply bill or tabling of a confidence motion.

From 1855 to 1907, the position of first minister was known as premier. After the colony was granted dominion status, the position became known as prime minister. Democratic government was suspended in 1934 and replaced by an appointed Commission of Government, until 1949 Newfoundland became a province of Canada. Since the reinstitution of democratic government in 1949, the title of first minister has been premier.

Since 1855, Newfoundland and Labrador has been led by ten Colonial premiers, nine Dominion prime ministers, three chairmen of Commission of Government, and fourteen provincial premiers. Of the provincial premiers, seven are from the Liberal Party, and seven are from the Progressive Conservative Party.

Premiers of the Newfoundland Colony (1855–1907)

Dominion Prime Ministers of Newfoundland (1907–1934)
By Royal Proclamation, the colony was granted dominion status on 26 September 1907 becoming the Dominion of Newfoundland with its head of government being given the title Prime Minister of the Dominion of Newfoundland.

Chairmen of the Commission of Government (1934–1949)
With the suspension of responsible government the dominion was administered by the Commission of Government, from 1934 to 1949. It was a body of seven appointed by the British government, made up of three British officials, three Newfoundlanders, and chaired by the Governor of Newfoundland.

Premiers of the Provinces of Newfoundland (1949–2001) and Newfoundland and Labrador (2001–present)

See also
 Leader of the Opposition (Newfoundland and Labrador)
 List of Newfoundland and Labrador lieutenant-governors

References
General

 
 

Specific

Newfoundland

Premiers

Premiers